Hold down may refer to:
 pinning hold, in grappling.
 hold down, a steel device in structural engineering.
 Holdfast, a type of clamp on a woodworking workbench.